Milton ferry wharf is located on the northern side of the Brisbane River serving the Brisbane suburb of Milton in Queensland, Australia It is served by RiverCity Ferries' CityCat services.

The Milton ferry wharf is currently not in service (as at Sep 14, 2022) due to damage resulting from Brisbane River floodwaters earlier in 2022. Check the [./Https://jp.translink.com.au/plan-your-journey/journey-planner TransLink Journey Planner] to see if the wharf is open for your journey.

Description
The wharf is located adjacent to Park Road and Coronation Drive intersection. It consists of a single pier that ends with a pontoon with two berths and covered passenger waiting area with seating.

History 
Construction commenced in June 2014 with the wharf opening on 18 January 2015.

References

External links

Ferry wharves in Brisbane
Milton, Queensland
Transport infrastructure completed in 2015
2015 establishments in Australia